Grandi cacciatori is a 1988 Italian adventure film directed by Augusto Caminito and starring Klaus Kinski.

Premise
After a man's wife is killed by a panther, his only reason to live becomes revenge, which slowly consumes him.

Cast
 Thomas Attguargarvak as Cacciatore Eschimese
 Roberto Bisacco as Hermann
 Deborah Caprioglio as Deborah
 Brian Cooper as Ufficiale
 Bob Crocket as Cacciatore Norvegese
 Moser Dangwa as Gubai
 Absalom Dhikinya as Shamano
 Nick Duggan as Bracconiere Africano
 Graham Early as Bracconiere Africano
 James Haas as Cacciatore Norvegese
 Roger Heacham
 Michael Hoffmann as Guardia
 Albert Jones as Cacciatore Africano
 Harvey Keitel as Thomas
 Klaus Kinski as Klaus Naginsky
 Steven Ningeok as Cacciatore Eschimese
 Rossahn Peetok as Capo Eschimesi
 Iris Peynado as Nera
 Yorgo Voyagis as Leader

References

External links

1988 films
Italian adventure films
1980s Italian-language films
1980s adventure films
1980s Italian films